Dugastella marocana is a species of shrimp from the Atyidae family. It can only be found in rivers and springs in northern Morocco.

It is classed as Endangered, according to the IUCN.

References

Crustaceans described in 1912